Seven Days in Sammystown is the third studio album by American rock band Wall of Voodoo, released in 1985. This was the first Wall of Voodoo album to include Andy Prieboy on vocals and Ned Leukhardt on drums—following the departure of frontman Stan Ridgway and percussionist Joe Nanini—and also features the return of original bassist Bruce Moreland. It includes their cover version of Merle Travis' "Dark as a Dungeon". The track "Far Side of Crazy" is featured in the 1985 movie Head Office. The album reached No. 50 on the Australian charts.

Reception

In a retrospective review, Allmusic's Rudyard Kennedy judged the album's biggest flaw as retaining the Wall of Voodoo without the distinctive presences of Ridgway and Nanini. Kennedy cited "Business of Love" and "Big City" as examples of failed attempts to imitate the original band, while declaring "Far Side of Crazy", "Room With a View", "Dark as a Dungeon" and "(Don't Spill My) Courage" to all be highlights.

Reissues
Seven Days in Sammystown was released on CD in 1989 by MCA Records (USA) on the IRS label and by EMI Records (Australia). In 2012, the album was remastered and re-released by Australian reissue label Raven Records as part of a double CD set with successive album Happy Planet, live album The Ugly Americans in Australia and three non album bonus tracks.

Track listing
Side one
"Far Side of Crazy" (Andy Prieboy) – 3:55
"This Business of Love" (Chas T. Gray) – 4:25
"Faded Love" (Bob Wills, John Wills) – :40
"Mona" (Bruce Moreland) – 4:55
"Room With a View" (Prieboy) – 2:47
"Blackboard Sky" (Prieboy) – 4:37

Side two
"Big City" (Gray, Marc Moreland, B. Moreland) – 4:20
"Dark as a Dungeon" (Merle Travis) – 4:40
"Museums" (M. Moreland) – 4:21
"Tragic Vaudeville" (B. Moreland) – 3:25
"(Don't Spill My) Courage" (Gray, M. Moreland) – 4:15

The original LP sleeve contains three errors: "This Business of Love" is listed as "Business of Love"; "Dark as a Dungeon" is listed as "Dark as the Dungeon"; and "Faded Love" is not listed at all. The correct track listing appears on the LP's label, as well as the CD and cassette, although the "Dark as the Dungeon" error can appear on some MP3 listings.

Personnel
Wall of Voodoo
Chas T. Gray – keyboards, vocal backing
Bruce Moreland – bass, keyboards
Andy Prieboy – vocals, keyboards
Ned Leukhardt – drums, percussion
Marc Moreland – guitars

Additional musician
John Parrish – additional percussion ("Museums", "Far Side of Crazy")

Technical
Ian Broudie – producer
Pete Hammond – remixing ("Far Side of Crazy")
Gil Norton – engineer
Dave Powell – engineer
Ray Roberts – cover painting
Scott Lindgren – photography

Charts

References

Wall of Voodoo albums
1985 albums
I.R.S. Records albums
Albums produced by Ian Broudie